Mount Claremont, known previously as Graylands, is a suburb of Perth, Western Australia, located within the Town of Cambridge and the City of Nedlands.

Graylands underwent significant changes in the 1950s, with the post war downgrading of military and migrant facilities in the area.

Current establishments
The suburb contains the Perth Superdrome, the Western Australian Institute of Sport (WAIS), Graylands Hospital, John XXIII College, Wollaston College, and lands owned by the University of Western Australia.

Former institutions
It was the site of the former Swanbourne Hospital, Graylands Teachers College (1955–1979), and Graylands Migrant Hostel (1952–1987).

Estates
Residential  areas in the suburb consist of four estates:
 Zamia Gardens – the newest area, still in the process of construction
 St Johns Wood – a relatively new estate, bordering John XXIII College and Graylands Hospital, with many larger blocks of land and often including views of the city
 St Peters Square – a higher density development, featuring townhouses oriented around a central park
 Old Mount Claremont – the original subdivision, consisting mostly of homes built in the 1940–1950s, including some properties bordering Cottesloe Golf Course

Demographically, Mount Claremont is reported to have a higher proportion of university or other tertiary graduates (23.4%) than the average in Perth (13.5%).

The southeast of the suburb is on the railway line between Karrakatta and Loch Street. Mount Claremont is also served by Transperth buses.

References

External links 
 

 
Suburbs of Perth, Western Australia